Ömür Gedik (born 22 December 1970) is a Turkish journalist. She is a writer for Hürriyet newspaper, artist, animal rights advocate, a member of SİYAD (Association of Cinema Writers), and founder and president of HAÇİKO Association (The Association for the Protection of Animals from Desperation and Indifference).

Education 
In 1992, Gedik graduated from Boğaziçi University, with a degree in English Philology.

Career 
After graduating from university, Gedik joined the Sabah Journal Group, and in 1993 she started working for Hürriyet. She worked as an associate lecturer at Boğaziçi University, Preparatory Department, for 1 year. Gedik started working at Hürriyet Culture Art Service in 1999. She has a column in Hürriyet Kelebek where she mainly focuses on cinema. Gedik started her television career in 2004. She prepared and presented the program Stüdyo on TV8 for 1 year. In 2005, she began hosting Cinemania, a cinema program broadcast on Kanal D. She opened the 2012 International Antalya Film Festival.

Recognition 
 Kral Pop Special Award for her project "HAÇİKO" (18th Kral Music Awards)
 Most Popular Song of the Year (25th International Tüketici Summit)

Animal rights 
{{Quote box|width=30em|align=right|Anatole France had said 'Until one has loved an animal, a part of one's soul remains unawakened.' I want you to continue to support me in my effort to wake those who are asleep. I get this award not only for cats and dogs, but for all animals with hair or without hair, and on behalf of animal lovers." |Gedik}}

Gedik draws attention with her work on animal rights. She is the founding president of the Association for Protection of Animals from Helplessness and Indifference (HAÇİKO). Gedik, took part in Prime Minister Recep Tayyip Erdoğan's meeting with animal lovers in February 2011. She works with HAYTAP on animal rights.HAÇİKO SAHADA İYİ ÇALIŞIYOR, Ayşe Arman röportajı, Hürriyet, retrieved 7 January 2013Hayvanlar için stüdyoya girdi, Hürriyet, 23 March 2011

She appeared on the album Hop Dedik Orda Kal, released for the benefit of animals. Gedik duetted with Teoman on the song "Portakal Orda Kal", with Burak Kut on "Aşk Var Ya", and with Halil Sezai on "Paramparça".

 Personal life 
Gedik has a daughter, named Tayga.

 Discography 
EPs
 Ayrılık Töreni (2021)

Singles

 Portakal Orda Kal (with Teoman) (2011)
 Paramparça (with Halil Sezai) (2011)
 Aşk Var Ya (with Burak Kut) (2011)
 Neden Yoksun (2013)
 Kaliko (maxi single) (2013)
 Taht Kurmuş Kalbime (45 Yıllık Baba Şarkılar) (2013)
 Dokun Bana (with Umut Kuzey) (2014)
 Bekle Bekle (2014)
 Hey Onbeşli (2015)
 Karşılaşma (2015)
 Dillirga (2015)
 İlişki Durumu Çelişkide (feat. H. Yılmaz) (2015)
 Aşk Mı Dedin (maxi single) (2016)
 Sana Ne Kime Ne (with Yalçın Aşan) (2016)
 Gece Hayvanı (2017)
 Gözyaşlarım Anlatır (2018)
 Neredesin Sen (2018)
 Kulakların Çınlasın (feat. Yalçın Aşan) (2018)
 Aşka Bağlan (feat. Serdar Ortaç) (2018)
 Güneş Seninle Doğar (2019)
 Aşkım (Aşkın'ın Şarkıları'') (2019)
 Manastırın Ortasında (Akustik) (2019)
 Resim (2019)
 Aramışsın (2019)
 Yıldızların Altında (feat. Tayfun) (2020)
 Mavrova (2020)
 Leylim Ley (feat. Rah) (2020)
 Bırakmam Seni (feat. Murat Başaran) (2020)
 Yaz Yağmuru (2020)
 İçimdeki Katil (feat. Ayhan Kavraz) (2020)
 İyi Bak Bana (2021)
 Unutmam (2021)
 Navaee (with Pedram Derakhshani) (2022)
 Deli Oluyorlar (2022)
 Yürek Haini (2022)
 Rüzgarın Ardında (feat. Pedram Derakhshani) (2022)
 Tutuşmak İstiyorum (with Mert Akyol) (2022)

References

External links 

 Official website
 Hürriyet profile

1970 births
Turkish animal rights activists
Turkish columnists
Turkish television presenters
Turkish film critics
Boğaziçi University alumni
Living people
Hürriyet people